Felipe Ribeiro may refer to:
 Felipe Ribeiro (footballer), Brazilian footballer
 Felipe Ribeiro dos Santos, futsal player
 Felipe Borges (handballer) (Felipe Borges Dutra Ribeiro)